The Islamic Revolutionary State of Afghanistan was a small Salafist Islamic state located in the north of Bashgal Valley, Nuristan Province. It was founded by Mawlawi Afzal during the nationwide Afghan mujahideen insurgency against the Soviet-backed People's Republic of Afghanistan and established consulates in Saudi Arabia and Pakistan.

See also 
 Islamic Emirate of Badakhshan
 Islamic Emirate of Afghanistan (1996–2001)
 Islamic Emirate of Kunar
 Islamic Emirate of Byara

Further reading
 Daan Van Der Schriek. Nuristan: Insurgent Hideout in Afghanistan. Terrorism Monitor Volume: 3 Issue: 10. May 26, 2006.  The Jamestown Foundation.

Sources

History of Nuristan Province
Afghanistan, Islamic Rev
Salafist states in Afghanistan
States and territories established in the 1980s
1980s in Afghanistan
Former countries in Asia
Former theocracies
Former unrecognized countries
Lists of former countries
Former countries in South Asia